Hovertank 3D, also known under a variety of other names (Hovertank or Hovertank One), is a vehicular combat game developed by id Software and published by Softdisk in April 1991.

Plot
Hovertank 3D is set during a nuclear war. In Hovertank 3D, the player controls Brick Sledge, a mercenary hired by an unknown organization (referred to by the game as the "UFA") to rescue people from cities under the threat of nuclear attack (largely political activists or scientists), both by the government and by large corporations. However, the cities are also full of mutated humans, strange creatures and enemy hovertanks.

Gameplay 

The player must drive a hovertank through the levels and try to find the people Brick is supposed to rescue. There are many enemies in the levels, who are hunting down the people as well as the player. The player can keep track of both people and enemies in the radar box at the bottom of the screen. There is a timer that counts how long until the nuke is dropped. Once all the living people are collected a yellow teleporter appears somewhere in the level, and the player must find it to win. The player receives their fee, based on the number of people safely rescued, and how fast the operation was completed. All damage to the hovertank is repaired at the end of the level.

Development
John Carmack's research in the game's engine took six weeks, two weeks longer than any id engine before it. The engine written for this game was expanded upon with texture mapping to make Catacomb 3-D, and then later still with raycasting for Wolfenstein 3D. Following the engine's completion, the id staff decided on the nuclear war theme and developed the game. Adrian Carmack enjoyed drawing the monsters and other ghoulish touches. The credits are John Carmack and John Romero as programmers, Tom Hall as game designer and Adrian Carmack as video game artist.

The source code to the game, owned by Flat Rock Software, was released in June 2014 under GNU GPL-2.0-or-later in a manner similar those done by id and partners.

Reception
Hovertank 3D is a landmark 3D game. Other 3D titles at the time, such as flight simulators and other games (such as Alpha Waves) that had more detailed environments, were noticeably slower. A similar engine was used by MIDI Maze for the Atari ST in 1987 and Wayout for the Atari 8-bit family from 1982.

Notes

References

External links
id's look back at Hovertank 3D

1991 video games
DOS games
DOS-only games
Vehicular combat games
First-person shooters
North America-exclusive video games
Science fiction video games
Wolfenstein 3D engine games
Id Software games
Apocalyptic video games
Video games about nuclear war and weapons
Commercial video games with freely available source code
Tank simulation video games
Video games developed in the United States
Video games with 2.5D graphics
Sprite-based first-person shooters